The Town of Brisbane colonial by-election, 1860 was a by-election held on 8 December 1860 in the electoral district of Town of Brisbane for the Queensland Legislative Assembly.

History
On 17 October 1860, Henry Jordan, member for Town of Brisbane, resigned. Robert Cribb won the resulting by-election on 8 December 1860.

See also
 Members of the Queensland Legislative Assembly, 1860–1863

References

1860 elections in Australia
Queensland state by-elections
19th century in Brisbane
1860s in Queensland